Kunle Adejuyigbe (born 8 August 1977) is a Nigerian sprinter.

Adejuyigbe won a bronze medal in 4 x 400 metres relay at the 1995 World Championships, together with teammates Udeme Ekpeyong, Jude Monye and Sunday Bada.

External links 
 

1977 births
Living people
Nigerian male sprinters
World Athletics Championships medalists
Yoruba sportspeople
20th-century Nigerian people